Fred Wilder (born November, 1962) is an American film director, screenwriter, actor, painter, and musician. His early career was devoted to painting, and creating electronic music including soundscape. His filmography as writer director includes the films Scream Karl (2006), and Karl Bites (2006),  which feature the robot Fast Karl. ZomBees (2008), and Vampire Flesh a Poem (2009),  both of which are experimental films driven by poetry. Wilder's films are known for surreal otherworldly and dreamlike images and he often incorporates stop motion animation with live action scenes.

He lives with his wife Candy in Orange County, California.

References

External links

 https://www.pghcitypaper.com/pittsburgh/trailer-trash-a-film-journal-covers-three-harrowing-years-in-the-life-of-west-virginia-artist-don-diego-ramirez/Content?oid=1339312

American filmmakers
Living people
1962 births